Bairnkine is a hamlet on the Jed Water in the Scottish Borders area of Scotland, on the A68, south of Jedburgh.

Other places nearby include Abbotrule, Bedrule, Camptown, Chesters, Langlee, Mervinslaw and Oxnam.

See also
List of places in the Scottish Borders
List of places in Scotland

External links

RCAHMS record for Bairnkine
GEOGRAPH image: New plantation at Bairnkine
STREETMAP: Bairnkine
Aerial photos of Bairnkine

Villages in the Scottish Borders